Vladislav Panev (Bulgarian: Владислав Панев) is a Bulgarian economist and politician. He is one of the co-chairs of the Green Movement.

References 

 demokrati.bg
 debati.bg
 results.cik.bg
 zelenite.bg
 parliament.bg

Bulgarian politicians
Living people
1976 births